Ingrid Montes (born 1958), also known as Ingrid del Carmen Montes González is a full professor in the Department of Chemistry at the University of Puerto Rico, Río Piedras campus. She attained tenure in 1998. Her research focus is on chemical education and organometallic chemistry.  Montes has been Director-at-large at the American Chemical Society (ACS) since 2013. Montes founded the "Festival de Química" (Chemistry Festival) in 2005, this program was then adopted by the ACS in 2010.

Education 
Montes completed her B.S. in chemistry at the University of Puerto Rico, Río Piedras campus in 1980 and Ph.D. in Organic Chemistry at the University of Puerto Rico, Río Piedras campus under the supervision of Gerald Larson in 1985.

Research 
The Montes lab focuses on the synthesis and characterization of ferrocenyl compounds and chemistry education research.

Outreach contributions

Festival de Química (Chemistry Festival) 
In 2005 Dr. Montes started the "Festival de Química" in Puerto Rico. The "Festival de Quimica' is a community outreach program created to engage the general public through chemistry demonstrations and its relation to daily life. This program became an official ACS program in 2010. In 2016, the ACS festival training launched around the world.  News Highlights of the event are listed below:

 Australia hosts the first Chemistry Festival (2017). 
 Chemistry Festival was featured in TV Peru (2017). 
 The ACS Malaysia International Chemical Sciences Chapter hosted a Festival Training Institute (2017). 
 The Chemistry Festival Arrived to Beijing (2014). 
 Puerto Rico local section celebrated the Chemistry Festival along with "Chemists celebrate Earth week (CCED)" and won the ChemLuminary Award for its involvement (2013). 
 Nurturing Chemistry Undergrads (2013). 
 Monumental periodic table build during the Chemistry Festival in  Mexico (2011).

Awards and honors 
Ingrid has earned multiple awards selected honors and awards listed below:

 2018 - Mujer Puertorriqueña Distinguida en STEM, G Works, Inc.
 2017 - IUPAC 2017 Award for Distinguished Women in Chemistry or Chemical Engineering 
 2012 - 2012 American Chemical Society Volunteer Service Award

Selected bibliography

 Diversifying ACS’s membership demographics, Ingrid Montes, Chemical & Engineering News, 95(29), July 17, 2017.
"Synthesis and characterization of novel ferrocenyl chalcone ammonium and pyridinium saltderivatives” Inorg. Chim. Acta; 2017 
 Balancing the global equation for women in STEM, Ingrid Montes, Chemical & Engineering News, 94(28), July 11, 2016.
 The American Chemical Society and its Spanish resources, Ingrid Montes, Chemical & Engineering News, 93(45), November 16, 2015.
 10 Years Of Growth For The Festival De Química, Ingrid Montes, Chemical & Engineering News, 93(2), January 12, 2015.
"(E)-1-Ferrocenyl-3-(2-methoxyphenyl)prop-2-en-1-one” Acta Crystallogr., 2014, E70, m108–m109.
"Electrochemical and Spectroscopical Characterization of Ferrocenyl Chalcones” Journal of The Electrochemical Society, 2010, 157, 104-110.
"Assessment of Organic Inquiry-Based Laboratory Experiences Targeting Different Learning Styles: Ethnographic Study” The Chemical Educator, 2010, 15, 79–89.
 “A sticky situation: dissolving chewing gum with chocolate” J. Chem. Ed., 2010, 87, 396-397.
 Offer Your Service-The Benefits Are Endless, Ingrid Montes, Chair, Committee on Community Activities Chemical & Engineering News, 87(44), June 22, 2009.
“Counterion Effects in the Nucleophilic Substitution Reaction of the Acetate Ion with Alkyl Bromides in the Synthesis of Esters” J. Chem. Ed., 2009, 86, 1315-1318.
 NCW, Chemists Celebrate Earth Day, And The Importance Of Outreach, Ingrid Montes, Chair, Committee on Community Activities Chemical & Engineering News, 86(43), October 27, 2008.
 ‘The Many Faces of Chemistry’, Ingrid Montes, Chair, Committee on Community Activities Chemical & Engineering News,85(43), October 22, 2007.
 I. Montes J. Jankowski “Celebrating 20 Years of National Chemistry Week” J. Chem. Ed., 2007, 84, 1092.

See also

History of women in Puerto Rico
List of Puerto Rican scientists and inventors

References

External links 

Faculty profile  at the University of Puerto Rico Department of Chemistry website
 

1958 births
University of Puerto Rico alumni
University of Puerto Rico faculty
Puerto Rican women scientists
Puerto Rican scientists
Living people
American women academics